is a Paralympic swimmer from Japan. He competed mainly in S4 freestyle events.

Yuji competed as part of the Japanese Paralympic swimming team at the 2004 Summer Paralympics where he was part of the 4x50m freestyle squad that finished fourth and also the squad that finished second in the 4x50m medley behind the games record set by Brazil. He picked up a further two silver medals in the 50m and 100m freestyle on both occasions behind Brazilian Clodoaldo Silva he also finished third in the 200m freestyle that was again won by Silva. Silva has since been reclassified to S5, a class for more able-bodied swimmers.

, Hanada is recognised by the International Paralympic Committee as S4 world record holder in the 50 metre freestyle event, a record time he set at the Athens Paralympics in 2004.

References

External links
 

Living people
Japanese male freestyle swimmers
Paralympic swimmers of Japan
Paralympic silver medalists for Japan
Paralympic bronze medalists for Japan
Paralympic medalists in swimming
Swimmers at the 2004 Summer Paralympics
Medalists at the 2004 Summer Paralympics
World record holders in paralympic swimming
Year of birth missing (living people)
Place of birth missing (living people)
S4-classified Paralympic swimmers
21st-century Japanese people